Vallis Vale is a 23.9 hectare biological and geological Site of Special Scientific Interest near Great Elm in Somerset, notified in 1952.

Vallis Vale is an ancient woodland site and supports an Ash-Wych Elm stand type with a restricted distribution in Britain.

Vallis Vale exposes some of Britain's most classic rock outcrops, exhibiting several of the most easily demonstrated examples of angular unconformity available. A nationally important research and educational locality, of great renown for the part it has played in the historical development of geological science.

Sources

 English Nature citation sheet for the site (accessed 10 August 2006)

External links
 English Nature website (SSSI information)

Sites of Special Scientific Interest in Somerset
Sites of Special Scientific Interest notified in 1952
Unconformities
Geology of Somerset